The 2021 World's Strongest Man was the 44th edition of the World's Strongest Man competition, an event that took place in Sacramento, California from June 15 to June 20, 2021. The defending champion was Oleksii Novikov of Ukraine, however, he failed to progress to the final after coming fourth in his heat. In so doing, he became the first World's Strongest Man reigning champion to compete at the following year's event and fail to qualify for the final since Magnús Ver Magnússon in the 1997 competition. The contest was won by Tom Stoltman who improved on his second place finish the previous year. Four-time champion Brian Shaw came second, returning to the podium after a 2 year absence, and Canada's Maxime Boudreault came third.

Participants
Graham Hicks of the UK withdrew the day before the competition began, and was replaced by Ervin Toots of Estonia. As a result, Gavin Bilton of the UK was moved from group 5 to group 1, and Toots took Bilton's place in group 5. 

Luke Richardson suffered a biceps injury during the first day of competition and withdrew.

Terry Hollands suffered an injury during day 1 of the heats, and withdrew after 2 events.

Chris van der Linde also withdrew from the competition after 2 events.

Finalists
The contest is divided in a qualifying round and finals. There are ten finals participants, and in 2021 they include:
 Brian Shaw (United States)
 Trey Mitchell (United States)
 JF Caron (Canada)
 Konstantine Janashia (Georgia)
 Bobby Thompson (United States)
 Maxime Boudreault (Canada)
 Tom Stoltman (United Kingdom)
 Eythor Ingolfsson Melsted (Iceland)
 Adam Bishop (United Kingdom)
 Luke Stoltman (United Kingdom)

Heat Results

Format
The 25 athletes were divided into 5 groups of 5 athletes, with 2 athletes from each group progressing to the final of 10. The winner of each group progressed to the final, and 2nd and 3rd in each group would then advance to a 'Stone Off', from which the winner would also progress.

Heat 1
 Events: Loading Race, Squat Lift for repetitions, Fingal's Fingers, Overhead Medley, Pickaxe Hold.

Stone Off

Heat 2
 Events: Loading Race, Deadlift for repetitions, Train Push, Overhead Medley, Pickaxe Hold.

Stone Off

Heat 3
 Events: Loading Race, Squat Lift for repetitions, Train Push, Overhead Medley, Pickaxe Hold.

Stone Off

Heat 4
 Events: Loading Race, Deadlift for repetitions, Fingal's Fingers, Overhead Medley, Pickaxe Hold.

Stone Off

Heat 5
 Events: Loading Race, Deadlift for repetitions, Fingal's Fingers, Overhead Medley, Pickaxe Hold.

Stone Off

Finals Events Results

Event 1: Giant's Medley
 Weight:  yoke,  frame
 Course Length:  yoke,  frame

Event 2: Titan's Turntable
 Weight: 
 Course Length: 
 Time Limit: 75 seconds

Event 3: REIGN Keg Toss
 Weight:  for maximum height
 Athletes get three attempts for each height

Event 4: Max Log Lift
 Opening Weight:

Event 5: KNAACK Deadlift
 Weight:  for repetitions
 Time Limit: 60 seconds

Event 6: Atlas Stones
 Weight: 5 stones ranging from

Final standings

Records
Mark Felix appeared in his record 16th WSM contest.

Brian Shaw qualified for his record 13th WSM final, breaking a tie held by him and Zydrunas Savickas. All 13 of these finals were consecutive, another record. He also extended his own record by appearing in his 14th consecutive WSM contest, and equalled the record 10 podium finishes of Savickas.

Travis Ortmayer set a record for longest absence between consecutive WSM appearances of 10 years, last competing at the 2011 contest. This broke the previous record of 8 years (2003–2011) held by Lithuania's Vidas Blekaitis.

In the third event of the final, 4 men broke the previous world record in the Keg Toss for height, which stood at 7.25m (held by Brian Shaw). Konstantine Janashia achieved 7.26m, whereas Tom Stoltman and Maxime Boudreault reached 7.50m, but Shaw reset his record at 7.75m.

References

External links
 The World's Strongest Man official website

 

World's Strongest Man